Bellator 283: Lima vs. Jackson was a mixed martial arts event produced by Bellator MMA that took place on July 22, 2022 at Emerald Queen Casino and Hotel in Tacoma, Washington, United States.

Background 
Visiting the state of Washington for the first time, the main event was to feature reigning Bellator Lightweight World Champion Patricky Pitbull taking on the challenger Sidney Outlaw. Patricky avenged a doctor stoppage loss to Peter Queally to capture the vacant lightweight title in November, while Outlaw has won his last two bouts in Bellator against Myles Jury and Adam Piccolotti after suffering a loss to former champion Michael Chandler. On July 4, it was announced that Patricky had substained an injury and that the bout would be moved to a later date. The next day, after Piccolotti pulled out of his bout against Tofiq Musayev, Sidney Outlaw and Musayev were booked against each other in the co-main.

The co-main event was to feature former Bellator Welterweight World Champion Douglas Lima taking on Jason Jackson. The bout was initially scheduled for May 13, 2022 at Bellator 281. However, due to unknown reasons, the bout was pulled from the event and was rescheduled for this event. After the main event between Patricky and Outlaw was scrapped and the reshuffling of the bouts, Lima vs. Jackson was upgraded to the main event and 5 rounds.

A light heavyweight bout between Viktor Nemkov and Jose Augusto was scheduled for this event, however due to a injury to Nemkov, the bout was scrapped.

A lightweight bout between Justin Montalvo and Vladimir Tokov was scheduled for this event, however due to an injury to Tokov, he pulled out of the bout and was replaced by Archie Colgan. Colgan instead faced Bryan Nuro in a 160 lb catchweight bout.

A featherweight bout between Kai Kamaka III and Akhmed Magomedov was scheduled for this event. Kamaka however pulled out of the bout due to unknown reasons.

At the weigh-ins, Douglas Lima, came in at 172.8 lbs, 1.8 pounds heavy for his headlining welterweight bout vs. Jason Jackson, along with Kevin Boehm weighing in at 147.6 lbs, 1.6 pounds over limit for his featherweight bout and Mark Coates weighing in at 137.8 lbs, 1.8 pounds over limit for his bantamweight bout. The bouts proceeded at a catchweight and they were fined a percentage of their individual purses, which went to their opponents.

Results

Reported payout 
The following is the reported payout to the fighters as reported to the Washington State Athletic Commission. It is important to note the amounts do not include sponsor money, discretionary bonuses, viewership points or additional earnings.

 Jason Jackson: $191,000 (includes $83,000 win bonus) def. Douglas Lima: $100,000
 Tofiq Musayev: $70,000 (includes $35,000 win bonus) def. Sidney Outlaw: $30,000
 Usman Nurmagomedov: $100,000 (includes $50,000 win bonus) def. Chris Gonzalez: $30,000
 Mukhamed Berkhamov: $33,000 vs. Lorenz Larkin: $125,000
 Marcelo Golm: $40,000 (includes $20,000 win bonus) def. Davion Franklin: $30,000
 Dalton Rosta: $50,000 (includes $25,000 win bonus) def. Romero Cotton: $25,000
 Veta Arteaga: $46,000 (includes $23,000 win bonus) def. Vanessa Porto: $18,000
 Gadzhi Rabadanov: $62,000 (includes $31,000 win bonus) def. Bobby King: $17,000
 Akhmed Magomedov: $24,000 (includes $12,000 win bonus) def. Kevin Boehm: $4,000
 Roman Faraldo: $20,000 (includes $10,000 win bonus) def. Luis Iniguez: $8,000
 Jaylon Bates: $22,000 def. Mark Coates: $4,000
 Archie Colgan: $7,500 def. Bryan Nuro: $4,000

See also 

 2022 in Bellator MMA
 List of Bellator MMA events
 List of current Bellator fighters
 Bellator MMA Rankings

References 

Bellator MMA events
2022 in mixed martial arts
Sports in Tacoma, Washington
July 2022 sports events in the United States
2022 in sports in Washington (state)
Mixed martial arts in Washington (state)
Sports competitions in Washington (state)